Arosi is a Southeast Solomonic language spoken on the island of Makira. Arosi is primarily spoken by inhabitants who live to the west of the Wango River on Makira (formerly known as San Cristobal Island). Makira is in the easternmost part of the Solomon Islands. Makira was visited and named by Álvaro de Mendaña de Neira in 1588. Upon landing on Makira, the Spanish were the first to record Arosi, but only six words were initially recorded. Arosi is one of the lesser known languages in Melanesia.

Phonology 
Arosi distinguishes 5 vowels and 17 consonants, including the velar nasal [ŋ] and the glottal stop. Unlike many other Oceanic languages, /b/, /bʷ/, /d/, and /g/ are not nasalized. Although there is a [j] sound in Arosi, it is not distinguished in writing from the vowel /i/. The chart below shows the consonants in Arosi. For the most part, the spelling of words in Arosi is phonemic.

Sounds /k, ɡ/ can have labialized allophones [kʷ, ɡʷ] when before rounded vowels.

Syllable Structure 
Syllables never end in a consonant; every syllable has either V or CV structure. The table below shows examples illustrating different types of syllable structure in Arosi:

Word Stress 
Arosi words can bear two types of stress:
 Word Stress
 Phrase/Sentence Stress

Word Intonation 
Compared to English and other Western European languages, Arosi's intonation tends to waver from higher to lower tones more quickly rather than steadily increasing.

Morphosyntax 
Arosi sentences can be divided into two basic types: major sentences and minor sentences.

Major Sentences 
Major sentences include a predicate, and at least one verb form. Major sentences can also be broken down into three categories: simple, compound, and complex. Major sentences consist of a noun phrase (NP) and verb phrase (VP). The subject of the sentence can often be broken down into these two types of phrases. Linking the two phrases (NP + VP) creates a compound sentence. Finally, complex sentences are made of compound sentences with subordinate clauses to the main phrase of the sentence.

In addition to noun-phrases (NP) and verbal phrases (VP), other elements that can be added to a sentences, such as a Location (L), Time (T), or Reason (R). These complex sentences are schematized as follows:

 S --> NP + VP ± L ± T
 +S + V + O ± L ± T ± R

Examples of different sentence types are presented in the table below.

There are three requirements for a verbal phrase in Arosi:
 there must be a subject marker (SM),
 the SM be made up of a morpheme, and
 the verb follows the aspect marker.

Minor Sentences 
A minor sentence does not include a predicate. Minor sentences are interjections, yes-no Sentences, as well as Equational and descriptive sentences.

Interjections 
Interjections are most often verbs or nouns. When acting as an appellative, the 2nd person pronoun is used (regardless of the addition of -na). Other interjections that are commonly used are kaia 'I do not know' and bwaia 'I do not understand'.

Yes-No 
The next type of minor sentence is the yes-no sentence. These are questions that can be answered with 'yes' or 'no', in Arosi io and 'ai'a, respectively. An example of a yes-no sentence is 'o tauaro? Io! 'Are you working? Yes!'.

Equational and Descriptive 
he third type of minor sentence is the Equational and Descriptive sentence, which exists primarily due to the fact that there is no copula (any verb "to be") in Arosi. Equational and descriptional sentences are used to show equality between two different things.

Pronouns 
In Arosi there are three forms of short pronouns. Singular, dual and plural numbers are distinguished. Pronouns in Arosi, to an extent, differ from pronouns of most other European languages. Gender is not distinguished in the third person in Arosi. Due to the non-distinguishable third-person pronoun, there is no equivalent to 'he' or 'she' in Arosi. In Arosi, pronouns also possess a dual number as well as a singular and plural. There is a distinction made in the first person non-singular between an 'inclusive' form ( we = you and I) and 'exclusive form [we = he (or they) and I]

Tenses 
Melanesian languages are not precise when referring to the time of an action. In Arosi, it is important to understand the "Time of Action" and the "State of Action". There are also three different tense systems in Arosi: Indefinite, past and future.

The "+" sign in the chart shows presence while the "-" sign means the "lack of" a given form.

Word Classification 
Nouns are divided into simple nouns and a phrasal nouns. The majority of words involving the naming of people or objects are simple nouns. This does not apply to names of people.

Simple Nouns 
Nouns in Arosi are not classified by gender. Different types of simple nouns are presented below:

Phrasal Nouns 
Unlike simple nouns, phrasal noun have two lexicons of reference. Usually, lexical components are held together by the preposition i, which can be translated as English 'of'. Sometimes, the word noni person is also used. For example, as in noni tauaro 'workman' (lit. "person work") or in hua i rumu 'oil flask, where the words are joined by 'i instead.

Derived Nouns 
Compared to Malaita languages, Arosi has very few derived nouns. The primary prefixes used in Arosi are hai- and ha'i-. Some examples of these prefixes in use are presented below:

Arosi also uses suffixes. The most commonly used suffix is -ha, which is most commonly used as a nominalizing suffix.

Interrogatives 
The following is a list of question words:

Numerals 
In the table below, there is a translation of different numbers in Arosi. Due to the fact that Arosi has a base-ten numeral system, you will begin to notice a common pattern when counting numbers beyond ten. When counting, numerals are repeated then are followed by mana, or ma meaning and as well as the verb adara meaning to exceed, to go beyond. As you can see in the table, mana or ma is added between e ta’ ai tangahuru and e ta’ ai to combine the numerals for ten and one to make eleven. From 100 to 999 the same concept when counting numbers applies. The word for 1000 in Arosi is meru. Meru is the highest numeral term in Arosi. Arosi also has a distinct way of counting specific and particular items.

References

Bibliography
 
 
 

 E rine nau maea; mana heiaauhi inia, ma tarai rihunai ini haagorohi (Anglican Holy Communion manual with prayers for daily use and hymns, 1955)

External links 

 Anglican liturgical texts in Arosi
 List of basic vocabulary in Arosi (source: ABVD)
 New Testament in Arosi
 Arosi research papers

Languages of the Solomon Islands
Malaita-San Cristobal languages